Crawford Castle, substantially in ruins, is located on the north bank of the River Clyde, around  north of Crawford, South Lanarkshire, Scotland. The ruins stand on an earlier motte and bailey earthwork. The castle is also known as Lindsay Tower, after its former owners, the Lindsay family.

History
Archaeological excavations to the north-west of the castle have shown that a Roman fort, with a garrison of perhaps 300, existed at this site between 80 AD and 170 AD.

This site was the administrative center for the Barony of Crawford, at that time the largest and most influential barony in southern Scotland. The Barony was established before 1100 when records of the period show Sveinn, son of Thor, as Lord of Crawford. From this line descended the surname of Crawford as the original occupants of the barony. Crawford Castle was in existence by 1175, and was probably built as an earthwork and timber castle some time before this by Sveinn's father Thor, sheriff of Edinburghshire, or indeed by Thor's father Sveinn.

The Lindsay family inherited the barony of Crawford when William Lindsay married ca. 1154 the younger daughter of Thor, sheriff of Edinburghshire, and granddaughter of Sveinn, Lord of Crawford. Following the death of Thor in about 1165, it was probably William Lindsay who built the stone castle in 1175. He is recorded as Lord of Crawford by 1185x1190. Crawford Castle is located in Crawford Parish. From an early date, the Clan Carmichael of Meadowflat acted as hereditary constables of the castle, retaining this post under successive owners.

In 1398, Robert II granted the title of Earl of Crawford to David Lindsay, who had won great praise on St George’s Day, 23 April 1390 for bravery in a duel with the Englishman Baron Welles on London Bridge after Welles, at a banquet in Edinburgh, and presumably after too much alcohol issued, as Champion of England, the challenge: "Let words have no place; if ye know not the Chivalry and Valiant deeds of Englishmen; appoint me a day and a place where ye list, and ye shall have experience."

At the accession of James IV in 1488 the barony of Crawford was transferred to Archibald Douglas, 5th Earl of Angus for supporting his father, James III, against the young prince's rebellion. The Earls of Angus held the castle until 1578, when their estates were forfeited by the young James V. James used Crawford as a hunting lodge until his own death in 1542. His mistress, Elizabeth Carmichael, was the daughter of the hereditary constable.

After 1542 the barony was returned to the Earls of Angus, the keepership of the Carmichaels of Meadowflat coming to an end in 1595. In 1633 the 11th earl was created Marquess of Douglas, and the castle was probably rebuilt after this date. The castle then passed to the Duke of Hamilton, before being sold to Sir George Colebrooke in the 18th century. After a period of use as a farmhouse, the building was abandoned at the end of the 18th century, and much of the stone reused to build the present Crawford Castle Farm. Four stone tablets bearing coats of arms, one with the date 1648, are built into the west and south walls of the Castle Crawford House.

Ruins

The early earthworks of Crawford Castle comprise a motte around 5m high, with a surrounding ditch and a bailey some 45m by 33m to the south-west. On the motte are the remains of a curtain wall, surrounding an enclosure around 20m square. There may have been round towers at the corners of this enclosure, which probably dates to the 16th or early 17th centuries. A range of buildings on the south-west side of the castle were built at around the same time. This tower-like range was of three storeys, plus an attic, with a vaulted basement and projecting chimney-breast. To the south-east, a second range was added later in the 17th century, providing more spacious accommodation with larger windows. The prominent arched recess in the east wall suggests that a single storey building of some kind projected from the main structure at this location. Much of the present remains probably date from the 17th century rebuilding by the Marquess of Douglas.

Crawford Castle is specified in a list of monuments published by the Minister of Public Building and Works under the Ancient Monuments Consolidation and Amendment Act 1913. It is now a Scheduled Ancient Monument. The Royal Commission on the Ancient and Historical Monuments of Scotland lists the site as a castle or motte.

Footnotes

References
Blaeu Atlas of Scotland, 1654, p. 61 
Coventry, Martin The Castles of Scotland (3rd Edition), Goblinshead, 2001
Crawfurd, G. (1716), Peerage of Scotland, Account of Nobility, George Stewart Publisher, Paisley, Scotland.
Crawfurd, G. (1782), The History of the Shire of Renfrew, Alexander Weir Publisher, Glasgow, Scotland.
Lindsay, Maurice The Castles of Scotland, Constable & Co. 1986
Mason, Gordon The Castles of Glasgow and the Clyde, Goblinshead, 2000
MacGibbon, T. and Ross, D. (1887–92). The castellated and domestic architecture of Scotland from the twelfth to the eighteenth centuries,  Mercat Press : Edinburgh.
Salter, Mike The Castles of South West Scotland, Folly Publications, 1993

External links 

 Pictures of Crawford Castle 
 Video and information pertaining to Castle Crawford
 Clan Crawford Association

Castles in South Lanarkshire
Scheduled Ancient Monuments in South Lanarkshire
Listed castles in Scotland
Clan Lindsay
Clan Crawford